West Auburn Bridge is a historic structure located northwest of West Union, Iowa, United States. In 1880 the Fayette County Board of Supervisors contracted with Minneapolis engineer Horace E. Horton to design and build this bridge. The Whipple through truss bridge was completed for $7,598.79. At the time of its nomination it was one of only eight bridges of this design known to exist in Iowa. The West Auburn Bridge was listed on the National Register of Historic Places in 1998.

See also

List of bridges documented by the Historic American Engineering Record in Iowa

References

External links

Infrastructure completed in 1881
Bridges in Fayette County, Iowa
Historic American Engineering Record in Iowa
National Register of Historic Places in Fayette County, Iowa
Road bridges on the National Register of Historic Places in Iowa
Truss bridges in Iowa
1881 establishments in Iowa
Whipple truss bridges in the United States